Point Labatt is a headland located on the west coast of Eyre Peninsula in the Australian state of 
It is notable as one of the largest Australian mainland breeding sites for Australian sea lions. The land and the sea adjoining Point Labatt is part of three protected areas - the Point Labatt Conservation Park, the Point Labatt Aquatic Reserve and the West Coast Bays Marine Park.

Description

Formation, geology and oceanography
Point Labatt as a headland was formed when the sea reached its present level 7,500 years ago after sea levels started to rise at the start of the Holocene.

Point Labatt and the adjoining cliff line consists of a calcarenite known as the Bridgewater formation overlying a red granite known as the Hiltaba Suite.  The cliff top are finished with a soil consisting  generally of a thin layer of calcareous material.

Naming
Point Labatt was named as Labatt Point in 1908 after Mr. J. B. Labatt, the Assistant Engineer of Harbours in the South Australian Government.

Flora and fauna

Flora
The flora present at Point Labatt consists of a combination of both low shrubland and low open shrubland.  The low shrubland features the following plant species: Ribbed thryptomene, Coastal Daisybush, Melaleuca lanceolata, Triodia irritans and Lepidosperma concavum.  The low open shrubland features the following plant species: Melaleuca halmaturorum, Calocephalus brownii, Maireana oppositifolia, Grey Saltbush and Nitre Bush.

Fauna
The coastline immediately adjoining the point supports a colony of Australia sea lions which is notable as being one of the largest mainland breeding sites for this species in Australia.  Other species of Pinniped sighted at Point Labatt include Australian fur seal and New Zealand fur seal.  Other mammal species possibly include the western grey kangaroo and the euro while known to occur on the CaIca Peninsula, but have not been recorded in the vicinity of Point Labatt as of 1995.  The following feral mammal species have been recorded at the locality: cats, foxes and rabbits.
As of 1995, the following bird species have recorded as being present at Point Labatt: cormorants, gulls, terns, swallows, and kestrels.
As of 1995, the following reptile species are recorded as being present: the shingle back lizard and a species of dragon lizard.

History

Aboriginal use
As of 1995, the extent of use of Point Labatt and adjoining land by the Nauo people, the Aboriginal people who lived in the locality prior to European colonisation is not known.

European use
The land that adjoins Point Labatt was used for agricultural purposes until it was donated in 1972 by Ron, Myra and Ellen Freeman for the purpose of creating a protected area for the Australian sea lion colony.  The ocean immediately adjoining the point was a popular site for snorkelling with Australian sea lions prior to 1988.  Point Labatt is considered to an important tourist destination within the District Council of Streaky Bay, particularly as it and Seal Bay on Kangaroo Island are the only two places where Australian sea-lions can be easily observed in their natural habitat.

Protected area status
The point is associated with three protected areas.  The first is the Point Labatt Conservation Park.  The second is the Point Labatt Aquatic Reserve which protects the body of water immediately the south west of the conservation park's coastal frontage.  The third is the West Coast Bays Marine Park which consists of a restricted access zone immediately the point.

The point, some coastline to its immediate east and west as well as the adjoining waters with a total area of  has been listed as a "wetland of national importance" in the Directory of Important Wetlands in Australia since 1996.

Gallery

Citations and references

Citations

References

 

Headlands of South Australia
Eyre Peninsula
DIWA-listed wetlands
Wetlands of South Australia